Al-Majdal ("tower", also transliterated Majdal, Majdil and Mejdel) was a Palestinian Arab village, located on the western shore of the Sea of Galilee ( below sea level),  north of Tiberias and south of Khan Minyeh. It is identified with the site of the ancient Jewish town of Magdala, reputed to be the birthplace of Mary Magdalene, destroyed by the Romans during the First Jewish-Roman War.

Christian pilgrims wrote of their visits to see the house and church of Mary Magdalene from the 6th century onward, but little is known about the village in the Mamluk and early Ottoman period, indicating it was likely small or uninhabited. In the 19th century, Western travellers interested in the biblical history of Palestine documented their observations of Al-Majdal, generally describing it as a very small and poor Muslim village. In 1910–11, Zionists founded Migdal adjacent to Al-Majdal. Just prior to the outbreak of the 1948 Arab-Israeli war, Al-Majdal was depopulated and then largely destroyed. The Israeli town of Migdal has since expanded onto part of the village's former lands.

Etymology
The Arabic name Majdal means "tower" and preserves the ancient place name Magdala. Magdala was also known in ancient times as Migdal (Hebrew), and the Aramaic names ascribed to it are either Magdala Nunaya (also, Migdal Nunnaya or Nunayah; "Tower of Fish") or Magdala Tza'baya (also Migdal Seb'iya; "Magdala of the dyers" or "Tower of Dyers"), although some think these to be the same identification. Whether they are one and the same place has yet to be determined, as both Aramaic names appear in the Babylonian Talmud (Pesahim 46b) and Jerusalem Talmud (Ta'anit 4:8) respectively. Others ascribe the name of the site to the Greek Magdala Taricheae ("Magdala of the fish salters"), likely due to the town's famed fish-curing industry. The identification of Magdala with Taricheae, however, remains inconclusive. Archaeologist, Mordechai Aviam, who (like W.F. Albright) held that Tarichaea was to be recognised in the name Migdal (Magdala), admits that during the large archaeological excavations conducted at the site, no remains of fortifications or a destruction layer were found.

Josephus is the primary source for Taricheae (Ant. 14.20; 20. 159; J.W. 1. 180; 2. 252). H.H. Kitchener of the Palestine Exploration Fund suggested that Taricheae was to be identified with the nearby ruin, Khurbet Kuneitriah, between Tiberias and Migdal. Others identify Taricheae with Kerek. The Magadan mentioned in Matthew 15:39 and the Dalmanutha of Mark 8:10 are likely corrupt forms of Magdal (Magdala) and Magdal Nuna (Magdala Nunaya).

Mary Magdalene's surname as transcribed in the gospels is said to be derived from Magdala as her home and place of birth. Alfred Edersheim cites the Talmud as evidence for this naming practice, which describes several Rabbis as 'Magdalene' or residents of Magdala.

Majdal and Majdalani ("of Majdal") are common place names and family names in the Syria-Palestine region. Examples of such place names include Al-Majdal, Askalan), Majdal Yaba, and Al-Mujaydil (depopulated Palestinian villages located in modern-day Israel), Majdal Shams (a Syrian-Druze village in the Golan Heights), Majdal Bani Fadil (in the West Bank) and Majdal Anjar (in modern-day Lebanon).

History

Antiquity

During the Roman period, Magdala was a large Jewish city. Two synagogues dating to the 1st century CE were found there. The city was destroyed by the Romans during the First Jewish-Roman War.

Ottoman era

Francesco Quaresmi writes of al-Majdal in 1626 that "certain people have claimed that her house is to be seen there", but that the site was in ruins.

The small Muslim Arab village of Al-Majdal was located to the south of the land acquired by the Franciscans. Little is known about the village in the medieval or early Ottoman period, presumably because it was either small or uninhabited.

Richard Pococke visited "Magdol" around 1740, where he noted "the considerable remains of an indifferent castle", but didn't think it was the Biblical Magdala. The village appeared as El Megdel on the 1799 map of Pierre Jacotin. In the early 19th century, foreign travellers interested in the Christian traditions associated with the site visited the village. In 1807 U. Seetzen stayed overnight in "the little Mahommedan village of Majdil, situated on the bank of the lake." The English traveler James Silk Buckingham observed in 1816 that a few Muslim families resided there, and in 1821, the Swiss traveler Johann Ludwig Burckhardt noted that the village was in a rather poor condition.

Edward Robinson also wrote of Al-Majdal during his travels through Syria and Palestine in 1838. Transcribing its name as el-Mejdel, he described it as "a miserable little Muslim village, looking much like a ruin, though exhibiting no marks of antiquity." Robinson was nevertheless aware of the village's ancient associations:"The name Mejdel, is obviously the same with the Hebrew Migdal and Greek Magdala; there is little reason to doubt that this place is the Magdala of the New Testament, chiefly known as the native town of Mary Magdalene. The ancient notices respecting its position are exceedingly indefinite; yet it seems to follow from the New Testament itself, that it lay on the west side of the lake. After the miraculous feeding of four thousand, which appears to have taken place in the country east of the lake, Jesus 'took ship and came into the coast of Magdala;' for which Mark the Evangelist writes Dalmanutha. Here, the Pharisees began to question him, but he 'left them, and entering into the ship again, departed to the other side [...] This view is further confirmed by the testimony of the Rabbins in the Jerusalem Talmud, compiled at Tiberias; who several times speak of Magdala as adjacent to Tiberias and Hammath or the hot springs. The Migdal-el of the Old Testament in the tribe of Naphtali was probably the same place."

In his account of a United States expedition to the Jordan River and the Dead Sea in 1849, William Francis Lynch writes of Mejdel that it is, "a poor village of about 40 families, all fellahin," living in houses of stone with mud roofs, similar to those in Tur'an. Arriving at Al-Majdal by boat a few years later, Bayard Taylor describes the view from path winding up from shoreline, "[...] through oleanders, nebbuks, patches of hollyhock, anise-seed, fennel, and other spicy plants, while on the west, great fields of barley stand ripe for the cutting. In some places, the Fellahs, men and women, were at work, reaping and binding the sheaves."

Solamon Malan described the village houses in 1857: "Each house, whether separate or attached to another, consisted of one room only. The walls built of mud and of stones, were about ten or twelve feet high; and perhaps as many or more feet square. The roof which was flat, consisted of trunks of trees placed across from one wall to another, and then covered with small branches, grass and rushes; over which a thick coating of mud and gravel was laid. ... A flight of rude steps against the wall outside leads up to the roof; and thus enables those who will to reach it without entering the house."

Al-Majdal had two shrines: the maqam of sheikh Muhammad al-‘Ajami to the north of the village and the maqam of sheikh Muhammad ar-Raslan (or ar-Ruslan) south of the village, as shown on PEF maps and on British maps of the 1940s. The first shrine was mentioned by Victor Guérin, who in 1863 arrived in the village from the north, moving from Khan al-Minya: “At seven twenty minutes I crossed the fifth important stream, called Wadi al-Hammam. Behind him is a wely dedicated to the saint Sidi al-Adjemy. At seven o'clock twenty-five minutes I reach Mejdel, a village which I pass without stopping, having already visited it enough”.

Isabel Burton to mention the shrine for Muhammad al-‘Ajami, while imparting other details on life in Al-Majdal. In her private journals published in 1875, she writes, "First we came to Magdala (Mejdel) ... There is a tomb here of a Shaykh (El Ajami), the name implies a Persian Santon; there is a tomb seen on a mountain, said to be that of Dinah, Jacob's daughter. Small boys were running in Nature's garb on the beach, which is white, sandy, pebbly, and full of small shells." Probably, in the tomb of Dinah, Jacob's daughter, one should see the second Muslim shrine — the maqam of sheikh Muhammad ar-Raslan.

In 1881 the PEF's Survey of Western Palestine described al-Majdal as a stone-built village, situated on a partially arable plain, with an estimated population of about 80. Fellahin from Egypt are said to have settled in the village some time in the 19th century.

A population list from about 1887 showed  el Mejdel to have about 170 inhabitants; all Muslims.

British Mandate era
Bellarmino Bagatti and another Franciscan friar who visited the village in 1935 were hosted by the Mukhtar Mutlaq, whose nine wives and descendants are said to have made up almost the whole of the population of the village at the time. Part of the site was acquired by the Franciscan Custody of the Holy Land sometime after 1935.

In modern times, Al-Majdal had a rectangular layout, with most of the houses crowded together, though a few to the north along the lakeshore were spaced further apart. Built of stone, cement, and mud, some had roofs of wood and cane covered with a layer of mud. The smallest village in the district of Tiberias in terms of land area, its inhabitants, all of whom were Muslim, maintained a shrine for one Mohammad al-Ajami on the northern outskirts of the village. To the west of the village on the summit of the mountains, lay the remains of the Crusader fortress of Magdala (later known as Qal'at Na'la ("the fortress of Na'la"). Local belief held that the holes in the rock were caused by ants having eaten through it, and for this reason it was called hajar al-namla, "the ant´s stone."

At the time of the 1922 census of Palestine, Majdal had a population of 210 Muslims, increasing to 284 Muslims living in 62 houses by the 1931 census.

The village economy was based on agriculture, vegetables and grain were the most important agricultural products.

In the 1945 statistics Al-Majdal had a population of 360 Muslims with a total land area of 103 dunams. Of this, 24 dunams were used for growing citrus and bananas, and 41 dunums devoted to cereals. Another 17 dunams were irrigated or used for orchards, while 6 dunams were classified as built-up (urban) area.

1948 War
During the 1947–1948 civil war in Mandatory Palestine, after the Arab quarter of Tiberias was taken by Jewish forces and its inhabitants were evacuated, the Arab villages surrounding it were also depopulated, including Al-Majdal. Benny Morris writes that the inhabitants of Al-Majdal were 'persuaded by the headmen of [neighbouring Jewish] Migdal and Ginosar' to evacuate their homes; the villagers were paid P£200 for eight rifles, ammunition and a bus they handed over. They were then transported to the Jordanian border in Jewish buses. Al-Majdal was subsequently bulldozed by the Israelis in 1948. After 1948, Migdal expanded to include some of the village land of Al-Majdal.

Aftermath

After 1948, the maqam of sheikh Muhammad al-‘Ajami disappeared without a trace. But the maqam of Muhammad ar-Raslan, located south of the village, survived. To this day, Muslim pilgrims visit it.

Walid Khalidi describes the village remains in 1992: "The site is dotted with rubble, Christ's-thorn, and a few palm and olive trees. The only remaining village landmark is the neglected shrine of Muhammad al-'Ajami, a low, square, stone structure topped by a formerly whitewashed dome. The land in the vicinity is cultivated by Israelis." In his book, Khalidi published a photo of the maqam of sheikh Muhammad ar-Raslan, confusing it with the disappeared maqam of sheikh Muhammad al-‘Ajami. This erroneous name of the shrine was taken by the following researchers.

Petersen examined the maqam (shrine) of Muhammad al-Ajami in 1991, and described it as a small square building with a shallow dome supported by squinches. The entrance was on the north side, where there also was a small window. The larger tomb was covered with purple and green cloth.

From her visits there in the 1980s and 1990s, Jane Schaberg also describes the site, noting it is marked by a rusty road sign indicating that, "this was the birthplace of Mary Magdelene, a city that flourished toward the end of the second temple period, and one of the cities fortified by Joseph ben Matityahu (Josephus) during the great revolt of the Jews against the Romans." She also writes that the site is cordoned off by an inner stone wall topped with chain link and barbed wire and an outer barbed wire fence, and still contains the Islamic dome structure and an old stone house. Weeds have grown over where excavations were carried out in the 1970s, which were suspended because of the problem posed by water from underground springs. An Arab family living in a corrugated shack serve as caretakers for the part of the site owned by the Franciscans, the Greek Orthodox Church owns another small piece of land, while the Jewish National Fund (JNF) owns the remainder.

Excavations

At the beginning of the 20th century, R. Lendle, a German architect purchased some land from the Arab villagers to carry out excavations, but no reports were made of the findings. The remains of a church with an apse and a stone inscribed with a cross and the date 1389 were found near Birqat Sitti Miriam (Arabic: "The Pool of Our Lady Mary") on the Franciscan-owned grounds.

Between 1971 and 1976, excavations also discovered the remains of what is thought to have been a Byzantine era monastery near the sea. The excavations were hindered by the water from underground springs, as well as the destruction wrought by the bulldozing of the Arab village which pushed many ancient artifacts towards the sea. The mosaic of the Byzantine monastery was badly damaged, though part of the geometric and cross design of red, white, blue and ash-coloured stones could still be seen. A Roman era paved road dating to the 1st century CE was also uncovered and identified. To the east of it, a building encompassing  of closed space was revealed that is thought to be either a 1st-century CE mini-synagogue or nymphaeum. Other findings include a tower, aqueduct, and large paved court enclosed by colonnades to the south, and to the north, a large urban villa. The villa was in use between the 1st century CE and the Byzantine era; a Greek inscription at the doorstep reading kai su ("and you" or "you too") is the only one of its kind to be found in Israel, though similar inscriptions have been found in private homes excavated in Antioch.

Other artifacts discovered in the excavations of the 1970s include a needle and lead weights for repairing and holding down fishing nets, and numerous coins. Many of the coins dated to the time of the first Jewish revolt against Rome (66 - 70 CE), four to the 3rd century CE, and in the top layer, one dated to the time of Constantine. Another cache of coins found there contained 74 from Tyre, 15 from Ptolemais, 17 from Gadara, 14 from Scythopolis, 10 from Tiberias, 9 from Hippos, 8 from Sepphoris and 2 from Gaba.

Archaeologists believe it served as a lighthouse for fishermen. It has since been submerged by the waters once again.

In 2014, Joan Taylor argued against the identification of al-Majdal with either Magdala or Tarichaea, and questioned the association with Mary Magdelene.

See also
Migdal
Magdala
Tarichaea

References

Bibliography

 
 

 
 

 

  

   
 
 
 
 

 

    ( p.70 )

External links
Welcome to al-Majdal
al-Majdal (Tiberias), Zochrot
Maqam sheikh Muhammad al-‘Ajami (Majdal)
Survey of Western Palestine, Map 6:  IAA, Wikimedia commons
Al-Majdal at Khalil Sakakini Cultural Center
Al-Majdal, Dr. Moslih Kanaaneh
 Al-Majdal

Arab villages depopulated during the 1948 Arab–Israeli War
New Testament cities
District of Tiberias
Ancient Jewish settlements of Galilee